Romané is a Chilean soap opera (telenovela) that was first aired on March 6, 2000 as part of the first semester prime-time lineup of soap operas on TVN. It competed against Canal 13’s Sabor A Ti.

Plot
The last time the beautiful Roma woman Jovanka Antich (Claudia Di Girólamo) was in Chile, she was a teenager and had a secret, torrid affair with Raphael Dominguez (Francisco Melo) the son of a local well-to-do family.  The affair ended badly, with both of them believing that the other betrayed them - when really it was Raphael’s mother Victoria North (Marés González) with the help of the power hungry and vengeful Roma Drago (José Soza) who tricked the young lovers into hating each other and separating.

The day they had planned to run away together Raphael doesn’t show and Jovanka leaves Mejillones alone, never to tell him she is pregnant.  She ends up in Spain where she has a baby girl and marries a wealthy and good Roma man named Jairo. They adopt two other girls, and the three of them grow up believing they all adopted.

Jovanka has now returned to Chile, with her daughters and now a rich widow, after 25 years to attend her father’s wedding. Her father, Melquíades (Héctor Noguera) has brought his whole tribe with him to Mejillones where he plans on marrying the young beauty Milenka California (Blanca Lewin), daughter of Jovanka's once-fiancé Lazlo (Alfredo Castro). Jovanka finds herself once again in this town that brings back so many memories.

Many of the townspeople like Victoria North have an adverse hatred and prejudice towards gypsies, but the town itself is doing poorly with many businesses on the verge of bankruptcy, and the arrival of the Roma will change all that. It's not long before Jovanka runs into Raphael again, and Victoria, afraid that she'll be found out, comes to tell her to leave. Remembering all the pain of the past,  still hurt and humiliated from Raphael’s abandonment, this only provokes Jovanka to shout out for the whole town to hear and know that the day Raphael Dominguez dies she will share her fortune and gold with everyone in the town.

From here is where things get complicated. People start attempting plots against Raphael. Victoria and Drago once again plot together to get rid of Jovanka. And Drago has his own plans to get rid of his best friend Melquiades so that he can become the leader of the tribe and have revenge against him.  Jovanka meanwhile starts to fall in love with Raphael's older brother Juan (Francisco Reyes) who unlike his brother has a great affection for the gypsies. However, he happens to be a priest, and both Jovanka and Rafael struggle with the mix of hate and love they feel for each other. And Raphael's son, Sebastián (Ricardo Fernández) becomes enamored with Maria Salomé (Francisca Imboden), one of Jovanka’s daughters, who may or may not be his half-sister.

Cast
Claudia Di Girolamo as Jovanka Antich
Francisco Reyes as Juan Bautista Domínguez
Francisco Melo as Rafael Domínguez 
Marés González as Victoria North 
Ricardo Fernández as Sebastián Domínguez
Francisca Imboden as María Salomé
Antonia Zegers as María Jacobé
Amparo Noguera as  María Magdalena 
Héctor Noguera as Melquiades Antich
Néstor Cantillana as Raúl Escudero
José Soza as Drago Stanovich 
Luz Jiménez as Mamá Pasca
Álvaro Morales as Rodrigo Cordero 
Alfredo Castro as Lazlo California
Felipe Ríos as Perhan California
Blanca Lewin as Milenka California
Alessandra Guerzzoni as Vinka California
Luis Alarcón as Baldomero Lillo 
Óscar Hernández as Alfredo Gaete 
Consuelo Holzapfel as Ofelia Lillo 
Delfina Guzmán as Adela of Gaete 
Eduardo Barril as Ismael Cordero
Violeta Vidaurre as Olimpia Brito
Carmen Disa Gutiérrez as Muriel Cruces
Sergio Hernández as Estefan Dinamarca
Roxana Campos as Zaida Dinamarca
Pablo Schwarz as Mirko Dinamarca
Andrea Freund as Rosario Gaete
Álvaro Espinoza as Claudio Gaete 
Claudia Cabezas as Javiera Bolaños
Mauricio Inzunza as Mario Cruces
Claudio Ravanal as Ianko Ilich
Juan Falcón as Branco Antich
Erto Pantoja : Ulises Jara
Daniela Lhorente as Paula Arévalo
Mireya Véliz as Inés Suárez
Ernesto Gutiérrez as The Anchoveta
Héctor Aguilar as The Piure
Ricardo Pinto as The Taza

References

External links
  Official Website 

2000 telenovelas
Chilean telenovelas
2000 Chilean television series debuts
2000 Chilean television series endings
Fictional representations of Romani people
Televisión Nacional de Chile telenovelas
Romani in South America
Spanish-language telenovelas